David Andross Farquhar  (5 April 1928 – 8 May 2007) was a New Zealand composer and professor of music at Victoria University of Wellington.

Biography
Farquhar was born in Cambridge, New Zealand, in 1928 but spent most of his early years in Fiji. He was educated in New Zealand, and was a pupil at St Peter's School in Cambridge and Wanganui Collegiate School. He was an accomplished sportsman and academic at both schools, captaining the cricket team in summer and hockey team in winter. He also broke many of their short- and middle-distance running records. He began his university studies in Christchurch before completing his degree at Victoria University College where he studied with Jenny McLeod and Douglas Lilburn. He went to the United Kingdom where he completed a Master of Arts at the University of Cambridge, and also studied composition with Benjamin Frankel at the Guildhall School of Music in London.

On his return to New Zealand in 1953, Farquhar joined the staff of the Department of Music at Victoria University, and rose to become professor of music in 1976, retiring in 1993. He was the founder-president of the Composers Association of New Zealand in 1974 and was awarded their Citation for Services to New Zealand Music in 1984.

In the 2004 New Year Honours, Farquahar was appointed a Companion of the New Zealand Order of Merit, for services to music. He wrote numerous orchestral, choral, stage and instrumental works, songs and music for children, and has been recognised since the 1950s as being at the forefront of New Zealand composition.

Farquhar died in Wellington on 8 May 2007.

Compositions

Ring Round the Moon 

This music was originally commissioned by Richard Campion for the New Zealand Players' production of Ring Round the Moon, Christopher Fry's adaptation of Jean Anouilh's play L'invitation au château. In the second act a ball takes place offstage and the text specifies a large number of dances. The music was first recorded on acetate discs by an ad hoc orchestra led by Alex Lindsay; these small recordings were then played through speakers for the production, sounding very loud to the cast but filtering out more gently to the audience.

At the end of the long national tour, the cast knew the music very well and suggested to Farquhar that he should do something with it. The result, some years later, 1957, was a suite of nine dances first performed by the Alex Lindsay Orchestra. This rapidly became Farquhar's most performed piece and was commercially recorded by the Alex Lindsay Orchestra in 1962, a recording still available today as a CD reissue.

Ashley Heenan, through the NZ APRA Committee, commissioned an arrangement for full orchestra for the National Youth Orchestra to take on a tour of Europe and China in 1975. This version was shortened to six dances by leaving out the first three numbers. The music has also been used for a ballet, The Wintergarden, choreographed by Arthur Turnbull for the Royal New Zealand Ballet, and a variety of other versions exists: a Waltz Suite (1989) for string orchestra; an arrangement of the original Dance Suite (1992) for violin and piano; as well as shorter arrangements for both brass band and concert band.

Other compositions 
A Unicorn For Christmas, opera in three acts 	
Concertino for piano and strings 	
Concerto for guitar and chamber orchestra 	
Concerto for Wind Quintet, for flute, oboe, clarinet, bassoon and horn 	
In Despite Of Death, a song cycle for baritone and piano 	
Magpies and other birds, settings of three poems by Denis Glover for vocal quartet
No-one and anyone, a setting of anyone lived in a pretty how town by E. E. Cummings for vocal sextet
Partita, for piano 	
Ring Round the Moon, Dance Suite for small orchestra 	
Scherzo for orchestra 	
String Quartet 	
Suite, five-movement work for guitar – Prelude, Capriccio, Ostinato, Rondino and Epilogue.
Symphony No. 1 for orchestra 	
Symphony No. 2 for orchestra 	
The Islands, song cycle for SATB choir 	
Three Cilla McQueen Songs, for mezzo-soprano and piano 	
Three Improvisations, for piano

References

Further reading
Thomson, John Mansfield. 1990. "Farquhar, David (Andress)", Biographical Dictionary of New Zealand Composers, edited by John Mansfield Thomson, 58–61. Wellington: Victoria University Press. 
Thomson, J[ohn]. M[ansfield]. 2001. "Farquhar, David (Andress)". The New Grove Dictionary of Music and Musicians, second edition, edited by Stanley Sadie and John Tyrell. London: Macmilln Publishers.

1928 births
2007 deaths
New Zealand classical composers
Male classical composers
New Zealand film score composers
Academic staff of the Victoria University of Wellington
People from Cambridge, New Zealand
Companions of the New Zealand Order of Merit
People educated at Whanganui Collegiate School
Victoria University of Wellington alumni
Alumni of the University of Cambridge
Alumni of the Guildhall School of Music and Drama
Male film score composers
20th-century male musicians